Noeeta is a genus of tephritid  or fruit flies in the family Tephritidae.

Species
Noeeta alini (Hering, 1951)
Noeeta bisetosa Merz, 1992
Noeeta crepidis Hering, 1936
Noeeta hemiradiata Dirlbek & Dirlbek, 1991
Noeeta pupillata (Fallén, 1814)
Noeeta sinica Chen, 1938
Noeeta strigilata (Loew, 1855)

References

Tephritinae
Tephritidae genera